Ne'eman may refer to:

People

Ari Ne'eman (born 1987), American autism rights activist
Ya'akov Ne'eman (born 1939), Israeli lawyer and Minister of Justice
Yuval Ne'eman (1925–2006), Israeli soldier, physicist, politician, and President of Tel Aviv University

Places
Migdalei Ne'eman, residential neighborhood of Tel Aviv, Israel

Newspapers
Yated Ne'eman (Israel), Israeli newspaper
 Yated Ne'eman (United States), weekly Haredi newspaper/magazine based in Monsey, New York

Law firms
Herzog, Fox & Ne'eman, Israeli law firm